Devanagari Extended-A is a Unicode block containing characters for auspicious signs from Indian inscriptions and manuscripts from the 11th century onward.

Block

History
The following Unicode-related documents record the purpose and process of defining specific characters in the Devanagari Extended-A block:

References 

Unicode blocks